Bonthainia is a genus of harvestmen in the family Sclerosomatidae from South and Southeast Asia.

Species
 Bonthainia aenescens Roewer, 1913
 Bonthainia annulata Suzuki, 1977
 Bonthainia celebensis (Roewer, 1955)
 Bonthainia elegans (Roewer, 1931)
 Bonthainia gravelyi (Roewer, 1929)

References

Harvestmen